The Soviet Union established diplomatic relations with Costa Rica on May 8, 1944, and Russia continues these relations as the successor state of the Soviet Union. Each of the two countries has an embassy in the other's capital city, Moscow and San José.

Present
Both countries are members of the United Nations, and since May 2019, holders of a Russian passport don't need a visa to visit Costa Rica. Russians can stay in Costa Rica for a maximum of 90 days entering the country for tourism.

Holders of a Costa Rican passport don't need a visa to Russia and a tourism stay of 90 days is allowed.

See also
Foreign relations of Costa Rica
Foreign relations of Russia

External links
Embassy of the Russian federation in San José

 
Russia
Bilateral relations of Russia